Madhi may refer to:

Places
 Madhi, Pathardi, Ahmednagar, Maharashtra, India
 Madhi railway station, Madhi, Tapi, Gujarat, India

People
 Mamta Madhi (born 1971), Indian politician
 Mohammad Reza Madhi (died 2021), Iranian spy
 R. Madhi (born 1971), Indian cinematographer
 Shabir Madhi (born 1966), South African professor of vaccinology

See also

 Madhi Madhi language
 Madhi Madhi people, another term for Mathi Mathi people
 
 Madi (disambiguation)
 Mahdi (disambiguation)
 Maddi (disambiguation)
 Maddy (disambiguation) including Maddie
 Mady

 Madie (disambiguation)